Cerberus (common name dog-faced water snakes) is a small genus of snakes in the family Homalopsidae.

Geographic range and habitat
Member species of the genus Cerberus are common inhabitants of Southeast Asia's mangrove habitat and mudflats.

Etymology
The generic name, Cerberus, refers to the dog-like Greek mythological creature Cerberus.

Species
The following five species are recognized as being valid.
Cerberus australis 
Cerberus dunsoni 
Cerberus microlepis 
Cerberus rynchops 
Cerberus schneiderii 

Nota bene: A binomial authority in parentheses indicates that the species was originally described in a genus other than Cerberus.

References

Further reading
Cuvier [G] (1829). Le règne animal distribué d'après son organisation, pour server de base a l'histoire naturelle des animaux et introduction a l'anatomie comparée. Nouvelle édition, revue et augmentée. Tome II. Les reptiles. Paris: Déterville. xv + 406 pp. (Cerberus, new genus, p. 81). (in French).

Colubrids
Snake genera
Taxa named by Georges Cuvier